Robert Lancaster may refer to:

Robert S. Lancaster, American computer programmer and skeptic
Bobbi Lancaster, golfer